Leptospermum squarrosum, commonly known as the peach blossom tea-tree, is an upright shrub of the family Myrtaceae and is endemic to central eastern New South Wales. It has thin, firm bark, broadly lance-shaped to elliptical leaves, relatively large white or pink flowers and fruit that remain on the plant when mature.

Description
Young stem are silky-hairy at first, soon glabrous.

Taxonomy
Leptospermum squarrosum was first formally described in 1788 by Joseph Gaertner in his book De Fructibus et Seminibus Plantarum from specimens collected by Joseph Banks.

Distribution and habitat
Peach blossom tea-tree gows in shrubland on sandstone soils in coastal areas and nearby tablelands of New South Wales, but especially in the Sydney region.

Use in horticulture
This tea-tree is a hardy shrub that grows best in a sunny situation in well-drained soil, but is salt-resistant and tolerates exposed positions.

References

Flora of New South Wales
Halophytes
squarrosum
Myrtales of Australia
Plants described in 1788
Taxa named by Joseph Gaertner